Helle Simonsen (born 27 August 1976 in Aars) is a former Danish handball player and World champion. She was part of the team that won the 1997 World Championship and also played for Viborg HK.

External links
 

1976 births
Living people
Danish female handball players
People from Vesthimmerland Municipality
Sportspeople from the North Jutland Region
20th-century Danish women